Michael Garrett may refer to:

* Michael Garrett (astronomer) (born 1964), General Director of the Dutch astronomy research foundation ASTRON
 Michael Garrett (composer) (born 1944), British composer
 Mick Garrett (born 1937), Irish Gaelic footballer
 Michael X. Garrett (born 1961), U.S. Army general
 Michael Garrett (politician) (born c. 1985), member of the North Carolina State Senate
 Mike Garrett (born 1944), American football player